Francis Clifford, 4th Earl of Cumberland (15594 January 1641) was a member of the Clifford family which held the seat of Skipton from 1310 to 1676.

He was the second son of Henry Clifford, 2nd Earl of Cumberland and Anne Dacre and inherited his title and estates on the death of his brother George, who had willed them to him in place of his daughter Anne. A long lawsuit between them over the possession of the family estates was settled in 1617.

He was elected Member of Parliament for Westmorland in 1584 and 1586 and for Yorkshire in 1604. He was appointed Sheriff of Yorkshire in 1600, constable of Knaresborough castle in 1604 and keeper of Carlisle castle in 1605. He was Custos Rotulorum of Cumberland from 1605 to 1639 and joint Lord Lieutenant of Northumberland (1607–1639), Westmorland (1607–1641) and Newcastle and a member of the Council of the North in 1619.

He married Grisold Hughes, daughter of Thomas Hughes and Elizabeth Dwnn (or Don), daughter of Sir Griffith Dwnn (or Don) and Elizabeth Roche-Eden, circa March 1589.

Children of Francis Clifford, 4th Earl of Cumberland and Grisold Hughes:
Lady Frances Clifford, married Sir Gervase Clifton, 1st Baronet
Lady Margaret Clifford (died 1622) married Thomas Wentworth, 1st Earl of Strafford.
Henry Clifford, 5th Earl of Cumberland b. 28 Feb 1591/92 – d. 11 Dec 1643

He died on 21 January 1640/41.

References

|-

|-

|-

4
1559 births
1641 deaths
Lord-Lieutenants of Cumberland
Lord-Lieutenants of Northumberland
Lord-Lieutenants of Westmorland
Francis
High Sheriffs of Yorkshire
English MPs 1584–1585
English MPs 1586–1587
English MPs 1604–1611
Cumbria MPs